Patrick B. Sullivan   (August 18, 1861 – April 14, 1901) was a 19th-century professional baseball player. He played for the Kansas City Cowboys of the Union Association in 1884.

External links

1861 births
1901 deaths
Major League Baseball third basemen
Kansas City Cowboys (UA) players
19th-century baseball players
Quincy Quincys players
Omaha Omahogs players
Keokuk Hawkeyes players
Milwaukee Brewers (minor league) players
Baseball players from Milwaukee
Burials in Wisconsin